Westbrook High School is a U.S. public high school located in Westbrook, Connecticut. The school serves grades 9 through 12, and usually enrolls between 300 and 500 students each year. Westbrook High School is a part of the Westbrook Public Schools. The school competes athletically and academically (e.g. High School Quiz Bowl) with many other shoreline high schools, and is well known for its music and theatre programs. It is located on McVeagh Road in Westbrook next to the St. Mark's Catholic Church.

References 

Schools in Middlesex County, Connecticut
Public high schools in Connecticut
Westbrook, Connecticut